The 1981 Wyoming Cowboys football team represented the University of Wyoming in the 1981 NCAA Division I-A football season. The Cowboys were led by first-year head coach Al Kincaid and played their home games at War Memorial Stadium in Laramie, Wyoming. They finished the season with a 8–3 record overall and a 6–2 record in the Western Athletic Conference to finish 4th in the conference.

Schedule

Roster

Season summary

BYU

References

Wyoming
Wyoming Cowboys football seasons
[[Category:1981 in sports in Wyoming]|Wyoming Cowboys football]